MEVSD may refer to:
 Marysville Exempted Village Schools District
 Milford Exempted Village School District, which operates Milford High School (Ohio)